Thomas "Tom" Hess (born Thomas Heslin August 15, 1875 – December 15, 1945) was a professional baseball catcher who played one season in Major League Baseball. He made his major league debut on June 6, and it would prove to be his last appearance as well. He would go on to play for multiple minor league teams.

Professional career

1892 season
On June 6, he played his only game at the major league level and didn't obtain a hit in two at-bats. This was his only season in Major League Baseball. On June 14, he was released by the Orioles.

1901–1911 seasons
After a nine year absence from professional baseball, Hess joined the non-affiliated Class-C Albany Senators of the New York State League during the  season. In 98 games, he batted .293 with 108 hits in 368 at-bats. The next season, Hess played 85 games with Albany and batted .230 with 72 hits in 313 at-bats. In 56 games, Hess batted .260 with 54 hits, seven doubles baseball, and one triple in 208 at-bats. In , Hess played for both the Class-D Waterloo Microbes and the Class-A Sioux City Soos. With the Microbes, Hess batted .100 in 16 games. He later played for the Soos where he hit .223 with 21 hits in 25 games. With the Quakers, Hess batted .209 with 43 hits in 61 games. In , Hess returned to Sioux City, Iowa to play for the renamed Sioux City Packers of the Western League where in 78 games he hit .245 with 64 hits in 261 at-bats. In , he began to play for the Class-C Galveston Sand Crabs of the Texas League. In , Hess played for both the Class-D Winston-Salem Twins, and the Class-B Wilkes-Barre Barons. With the Twins, Hess batted .320 with 16 hits in 17 games. After his move to the Barons, he batted .224 with 11 hits in 17 games. The next season, Hess played for the Class-B Elmira Colonels where he batted .189 with 10 hits in 23 games. He sat out during the  season, and returned to professional play during the  joining the Class-D Hamilton Kolts of the Canadian League where he batted .293 with 29 hits, three doubles, and one triple in 28 games.

References

External links

1875 births
1945 deaths
Baseball players from New York (state)
Baltimore Orioles (NL) players
Albany Senators players
Portland Beavers players
Sioux City Soos players
Sioux City Packers players
Galveston Sand Crabs players
Winston-Salem Twins players
Wilkes-Barre Barons (baseball) players
Elmira Colonels players
19th-century baseball players
Oskaloosa Quakers players
Burials at St. Agnes Cemetery